Varmā, Verma, Varman, or Burman are surnames found in India and South-East Asia.

Indian traditional usage 
According to Ayodhya Prasad Sah, the title was also used by some Brahmins in parts of Odisha, although it is recommended historically for the Kshatriyas.

Notable people
Notable people with surname "Varma" or its variants include:

Dev Burman
 Sachin Dev Burman, Indian music composer and singer belonged to the Tripura royal family
 Rahul Dev Burman, Indian music composer and singer, son of Sachin Dev Burman
 Nabadwipchandra Dev Burman, from the Tripura royal family; Indian Sitarist and Dhrupad singer
 Somdev Devvarman, Indian tennis star

Varma

 Amshu Varma, Nepalese Lichchhavi King
 Aneesh Varma, Entrepreneur
 Indira Varma, British actress of Indian origin
 Mahadevi Varma, Indian poet
 Maharishi Mahesh Yogi, founder of Transcendental Meditation (birth surname)
 Maipady Venkatesh Varma Raja, erstwhile Raja of Kumbla
 Manasi Varma (born 11 January 1966), Indian television actress 
 Marthanda Varma, founder of Travancore
 Prakash Varma, Film director
 Raja Ravi Varma, Indian painter, King of Kilimanoor Palace, Travancore
 Prince Rama Varma, musician, a direct descendant of Raja Ravi Varma
 Ram Gopal Varma, Bollywood Director and Producer
 Ravi Varma (actor), Indian actor
 Samyuktha Varma, Indian actress
 Shabareesh Varma, Indian Lyricist, Singer
 Shreekumar Varma, Indian writer and great grandson of the artist Raja Ravi Varma
 Shyamji Krishna Varma, Indian revolutionary fighter, lawyer and journalist

Verman

 Verman dynasty (4–7 c.), a dynasty of Kamarupa, including a list of rulers
 Suryaverman II, Great King of the Khmer Empire and builder of Angkor Wat

Verma
 Abhishek Verma (archer) (born 1989), Indian archer
 Abhishek Verma (businessman) (born 1968), Indian businessman
 Agys Ramsaran Verma, Indian politician from Uttar Pradesh
 Ajit Ram Verma, Indian physicist
 Alka Verma, Indian actress on the television show C.I.D.
 Aman Verma, Indian actor and T.V. host
 Aman Verma (footballer)
 Amit Verma (cricketer)
 Anshul Verma, Indian politician and member of the 16th Lok Sabha
 Anurag Verma, New Zealand cricketer
 Aru Krishansh Verma, Indian film actor
 Arun Verma, Indian politician and member of the Uttar Pradesh Legislative Assembly
 Atul Verma, (born 1997) Indian archer
 Baboo Lal Verma, Indian politician and state minister of the Government of Rajasthan
 Beni Prasad Verma, Indian politician and former Minister of Steel
 Bhagwati Charan Verma, 20th-century Hindi writer and winner of the Sahitya Akademi Award
 Bhanu Pratap Singh Verma, Indian politician who entered the Parliament of India in 2014
 Bindeshwari Prasad Verma, Indian politician and first Speaker of the Bihar Legislative Assembly
 Binod Bihari Verma, 20th-century Indian genealogist and writer
 Chandradeo Prasad Verma, Indian politician and three time member of the Lok Sabha
 Chotelal Verma, Indian politician and member of the Sixteenth Legislative Assembly of Uttar Pradesh
 Daya-Nand Verma, Indian mathematician after whom Verma modules are named
 Deepak Verma, British actor, writer and producer
 Deven Verma, Indian actor
 Dhirendra Verma, 20th-century Indian poet and linguist
 Gajendra Verma, Indian composer and playback singer
 H. C. Verma, Indian experimental nuclear physicist
 H. L. Verma, business science academic and administrator
 Harish Verma, (1982-) Indian actor
 Hemraj Verma, Indian politician and member of the Sixteenth Legislative Assembly of Uttar Pradesh
 Hikmat Singh Verma, Fiji Indian politician and former member of the House of Representatives of Fiji
 Inder Verma, molecular biologist
 J. S. Verma, Chief Justice of India
 Jai Verma, Indian Hindi writer
 Jai Prakash Verma, Indian politician
 Jhunnilal Verma, Indian lawyer and politician
 K. C. Verma, former director of RAW – India's foreign intelligence agency
 Kamla Verma, Indian politician and a former cabinet minister
 Kaushal Kumar Verma, (1971-) Indian mathematician
 Kimi Verma, Indian actress and fashion designer
 Lalji Verma, Indian politician and member of both houses of the Uttar Pradesh Legislature
 Mahendra K. Verma, Indian physicist working in magnetohydrodynamics
 Mahesh Verma, Indian prosthodontist
 Manas Bihari Verma, Indian aeronautical scientist
 Manikya Lal Verma, Indian politician and member of the Constituent Assembly of India
 Mayur Verma, (1991-) Indian television actor
 Mihika Verma, (1986-) Indian television actress and former model
 Motilal Verma, activist in the Indian independence movement
 Nakul Verma, (1991-) Indian cricketer
 Narendra Singh Verma, Indian politician and Uttar Pradesh Legislative Assembly
 Neelam Verma, Canadian television anchor, businesswoman and former Miss Universe finalist
 Neena Verma, Indian politician and member of the Madhya Pradesh Legislative Assembly
 Nirmal Kumar Verma, Indian admiral who served as Chief of the Naval Staff
 Nirmal Verma, Indian Hindi writer, activist and translator
 O.P. Verma, Indian administrator who served as governor for two states
 Om Prakash Verma (politician), Indian politician and member of the Sixteenth Legislative Assembly of Uttar Pradesh
 Parvesh Verma, Indian politician and member of the Parliament of India
 Phool Chand Verma, Indian politician, member of the Lok Sabha and a leader of Bharatiya Janata Party
 Pony Verma, Bollywood choreographer
 Purnima Verma, political and social worker and a Member of Parliament
 R.L.P. Verma, member of Lok Sabha and a leader of Bhartiya Janata Party
 Raghunath Singh Verma, Indian politician and member of the Lok Sabha
 Rajeev Verma, Indian actor
 Rajesh Verma, Indian politician and member of the Lok Sabha
 Rakesh Verma, Indian politician
 Rakesh Kumar Verma, Indian politician and Member of the Legislative Assembly
 Ram Murti Verma, Indian politician and member of the Sixteenth Legislative Assembly of Uttar Pradesh
 Ramdeo Verma, Indian politician and long-time member of the Bihar Legislative Assembly
 Ramkumar Verma, 20th-century Indian Hindi poet
 Rammurti Singh Verma, Indian politician and member of the Sixteenth Legislative Assembly of Uttar Pradesh
 Ramswaroop Verma, 20th-century activist and politician
 Randhir Prasad Verma, Indian police officer posthumously awarded the Ashoka Chakra
 Rashmi Verma, Indian politician and member of the Bihar Legislative Assembly
 Ravi Prakash Verma, Indian politician and member of the Rajya Sabha
 Ravi Verma, science administrator with a focus on AIDS and other social and public health issues
 Rekha Verma, Indian politician and member of the sixteenth Lok Sabha
 Richard Verma, American lawyer, public servant and United States Ambassador to India
 Rita Verma, Indian politician and former Minister of State of Mines and Minerals
 Roshan Lal Verma, Indian politician and member of the Sixteenth Legislative Assembly of Uttar Pradesh
 S. P. Sen Verma, former Chief Election Commissioner of India
 Sahib Singh Verma, Indian politician and former Union Labour Minister of India
 Sajjan Singh Verma, Indian politician and member of the Lok Sabha
 Sameer Verma (1994-), Indian badminton player
 Sandip Verma, Baroness Verma, Indian English politician
 Sangeet Verma, Indian photographer and photojournalist
 Satya Mohan Verma (1933-), Indian poet
 Saurabh Verma (1981-), Indian born American cricketer
 Shafali Verma, Indian women's cricketer
 Sheo Sharan Verma, Indian politician and member of the Lok Sabha
 Shivani Verma, Indian spiritual teacher and inspirational speaker
 Subhash Verma (1968-), Indian wrestler
 Sunil Kumar Verma, Indian biologist known for his work on DNA barcoding
 Sunil Verma, activist and survivor of the Bhopal disaster
 Surendra Verma, Indian Hindi litterateur and playwright
 Surendra Verma (science writer), Indian-Australian journalist and author of popular science books
 Sushma Verma (1992-), Indian cricketer
 Swati Verma, Indian film actress primarily working in the Bhojpuri film industry
 Tinu Verma,  Indian film action director, actor, writer and producer in Hindi cinema
 Usha Verma, Indian politician and member of the Lok Sabha
 Utkarsh Verma, Indian politician, and member of Uttar Pradesh legislative Assembly
 Veena Verma, Punjabi poet and short story author living in the United Kingdom
 Vikram Verma, Indian politician and political leader of Bharatiya Janata Party in Madhya Pradesh
 Vimla Verma, Indian politician and social worker and member of the Parliament of India
 Vineet Verma, Indian film director and animator
 Virendra Verma, Indian politician and member of Rajya Sabha and Lok Sabha
 Vrindavan Lal Verma, 20th-century Indian Hindi novelist and playwright.

References

Indian surnames